The 2000 European Cup was the 21st edition of the European Cup of athletics.

The Super League Finals were held in Gateshead, Great Britain.

Super League

Held on 15 and 16 July in Gateshead, United Kingdom

Team standings

Results summary

Men's events

Women's events

First League
The First League was held on 8 and 9 June

Men

Group A
Held in Oslo, Norway

Group B
Held in Bydgoszcz, Poland

Women

Group A
Held in Oslo, Norway

Group B
Held in Bydgoszcz, Poland

Second League
The Second League was held on 8 and 9 June

Men

Group A
Held in Kaunas, Lithuania

Group B
Held in Banská Bystrica, Slovakia

Women

Group A
Held in Kaunas, Lithuania

Group B
Held in Banská Bystrica, Slovakia

References

Results
European Cup results (Men) from GBR Athletics
European Cup results (Women) from GBR Athletics

European Cup (athletics)
European Cup
2000 in British sport
International athletics competitions hosted by England
Sport in Gateshead